Robert Young House is a historic home located in East Fallowfield Township, Chester County, Pennsylvania. It was built in 1856, and is a two-story, three bay, brick dwelling with a gable roof in the Federal style.  It features separated chimneys and Palladian windows in the gable ends.  The house was built for Robert Young, owner of the White Horse Tavern located across the intersection.

It was added to the National Register of Historic Places in 1985.

References

Houses on the National Register of Historic Places in Pennsylvania
Federal architecture in Pennsylvania
Houses completed in 1856
Houses in Chester County, Pennsylvania
National Register of Historic Places in Chester County, Pennsylvania